Public holidays in Togo are days when workers in the Togolese Republic get the day off work.

Holidays

Variable dates

2020
Easter Monday – April 13
Ascension Day – May 21
Korité – May 24
Whit Monday – June 1
Tabaski – July 31 
2021
Easter Monday – April 5 
Korité – May 13
Ascension Day – May 13
Whit Monday – May 24
Tabaski – July 20
2022
Easter Monday – April 18
Korité – May 3
Tabaski – July 10
Ascension Day – May 26
Whit Monday – June 6
2023
Easter Monday – April 10
Korité – April 21
Tabaski –
Ascension Day –
Whit Monday – May 29
2024
Easter Monday – April 1
Korité – April 10
Tabaski –
Ascension Day –
Whit Monday – May 20
2025
Easter Monday – April 21
Korité –
Tabaski –
Ascension Day – 
Whit Monday – 
2026
Easter Monday – Apr 6
Korité –
Tabaski –
Ascension Day –
Whit Monday –
2027
Easter Monday – March 29
Korité –
Tabaski –
Ascension Day –
Whit Monday –
2028
Easter Monday – Apr 17
Korité –
Tabaski –
Ascension Day –
Whit Monday –
2029
Easter Monday – Apr 2
Korité –
Tabaski –
Ascension Day –
Whit Monday –

References

Togolese culture
Togo
Holidays
Togo